"The Pink Phantom" is a song by British virtual band Gorillaz, featuring British singer Elton John and American singer 6lack. The track was released on 1 October 2020 as the eighth single for Gorillaz' seventh studio album, Song Machine, Season One: Strange Timez, and the seventh episode of the Song Machine project, a web series involving the ongoing release of various Gorillaz tracks featuring different guest musicians over the course of 2020. The song was later included on John's 2021 album The Lockdown Sessions.

Background
The song was recorded in 2020 during the COVID-19 pandemic, with Elton John recording from London, and Gorillaz singer Damon Albarn recording from Devon. The song was originally planned to be made solely with Elton John in Atlanta, where Albarn was meeting with 6lack and EarthGang. After the pandemic prevented these sessions, however, 6lack was added to the track.

Music video
The video, directed by Jamie Hewlett, Tim McCourt, and Max Taylor, features 2-D, Elton John, and 6lack performing a lavishly pink and emotional song inside Kong Studios during a thunderstorm. Prior to the video, the group used the portals seen in "Désolé" to evade the COVID-19 travel restrictions; the journey inadvertently warped Elton John and 6lack's appearances, turning the former into an animated character and the latter into a semi-holographic state. However, the two decide to continue with the shoot regardless. Meanwhile, Murdoc tries to catch the Pink Phantom with a butterfly net. After the song ends, Murdoc, dressed as a matador and strumming a guitar, attempts to join the others, but realises he missed the entire number.

The video is based on the opening credits of the 1975 comedy film, The Return of the Pink Panther. Elton John was presented in animated form in this music video as per his personal request to Jamie Hewlett.

Track listing

Personnel
Gorillaz
 Damon Albarn – vocals, instrumentation, director, bass, keyboards, piano
 Jamie Hewlett – artwork, character design, video direction
 Remi Kabaka Jr. – drum programming

Additional musicians and personnel
 Elton John – vocals, piano
 6lack – vocals, engineering
 Stephen Sedgwick – mixing engineer, engineering
 Samuel Egglenton – engineering
 John Davis – mastering engineer
 Matt Doughty – engineering

References

2020 songs
2020 singles
6lack songs
Elton John songs
Gorillaz songs
Songs written by Damon Albarn
Songs written by Remi Kabaka Jr.
Parlophone singles
Warner Records singles
Songs written by 6lack
Psychedelic pop songs
Rhythm and blues ballads
2020s ballads
Song Machine